Yengi Qaleh-ye Pain (also Romanized as Yengī Qal‘eh-ye Pā’īn and Yangī Qal‘eh-ye Pā’īn; also known as Yengī Qal‘eh-ye Soflá) is a village in Qushkhaneh-ye Bala Rural District, Qushkhaneh District, Shirvan County, North Khorasan Province, Iran. At the 2006 census, its population was 162, in 36 families.

References 

Populated places in Shirvan County